Dick Gradley (6 March 1932  10 September 2022) was a British gymnast. He competed in eight events at the 1960 Summer Olympics.

References

1932 births
2022 deaths
British male artistic gymnasts
Olympic gymnasts of Spain
Gymnasts at the 1960 Summer Olympics
Sportspeople from London